Mountrail County is a county in the northwestern part of North Dakota, United States. As of the 2020 census, the population was 9,809. Its county seat is Stanley. The county was originally created in 1873, then removed in 1892, annexed by Ward County. It was re-created and organized in 1909.

History
The Dakota Territory legislature created the county (as Mountraille County) on January 4, 1873, with area annexed from Buffalo County. It was not organized at that time, nor was it attached to another county for administrative or judicial purposes. The new county lost territory in 1885 when a portion was annexed off to create Garfield County (now extinct). This situation continued until February 21, 1891, when Mountrail County was attached to Ward County, for "judicial and other purposes". The following year (November 8, 1892), the North Dakota legislature voted to dissolve the county and have its territory absorbed by Ward County.

An election held in Ward County on November 3, 1908, authorized the re-creation of Mountrail County, although with different boundaries than the previous county proposal. The countywide vote totals were 4207 to 4024, but the result was contested in court. On January 16, 1909, the state Supreme Court upheld the vote, so the county government was organized on January 29 of that year.

Oil production from the Bakken formation in the early 21st century attracted workers and reversed decades of population decline in the county. From 2010 to 2015, especially, population markedly increased, creating its own strains.

Geography
The Missouri River flows southeastward along the SW boundary line of Mountrail County, and Shell Creek drains the lower central part of the county into the Missouri, discharging at Shell Creek Bay. The terrain consists of rolling hills, largely devoted to agriculture. Its NE portion is dotted with ponds and lakes. The Laurentian Divide runs east–west through the central part of the county, with the northern areas sloping to the north and the southern areas sloping to the south. Its highest point is on the upper west boundary line, at 2,480' (756m) ASL.

Mountrail County is one of several western North Dakota counties with significant exposure to the Bakken Formation in the Williston Basin.

Major highways

  U.S. Highway 2
  North Dakota Highway 8
  North Dakota Highway 23
  North Dakota Highway 37
  North Dakota Highway 1804

Adjacent counties

 Burke County - north
 Ward County - east
 McLean County - southeast
 Dunn County - south
 McKenzie County - southwest
 Williams County - west

Protected areas

 Crow Flies High Butte
 Lostwood National Wildlife Refuge (part)
 Palermo State Game Management Area
 Reunion Point Public Use Area
 Shell Lake National Wildlife Refuge
 Van Hook State Game Management Area
 Van Hook State Wildlife Management Area

Lakes

 Cottonwood Lake
 Lake Sakakawea
 Powers Lake (part)
 Rat Lake
 Robinson Lake
 Shell Lake
 Van Hook Arm
 White Lake

Demographics

2020 census
As of the census of 2020, there were 9,809 people.

2010 census
As of the census of 2010, there were 7,673 people, 2,793 households, and 1,852 families in the county. The population density was 4.20/sqmi (1.62/km2). There were 4,119 housing units at an average density of 2.26/sqmi (0.87/km2). The racial makeup of the county was 65.6% white, 30.6% American Indian, 0.2% black or African American, 0.2% Asian, 0.8% from other races, and 2.6% from two or more races. Those of Hispanic or Latino origin made up 3.7% of the population. In terms of ancestry, 36.6% were Norwegian, 24.4% were German, 6.6% were Irish, and 0.8% were American.

Of the 2,793 households, 31.1% had children under the age of 18 living with them, 48.3% were married couples living together, 11.4% had a female householder with no husband present, 33.7% were non-families, and 28.3% of all households were made up of individuals. The average household size was 2.55 and the average family size was 3.11. The median age was 37.0 years.

The median income for a household in the county was $53,912 and the median income for a family was $63,238. Males had a median income of $43,386 versus $29,432 for females. The per capita income for the county was $25,762. About 13.5% of families and 16.5% of the population were below the poverty line, including 24.2% of those under age 18 and 14.2% of those age 65 or over.

2000 census
As of the census of 2000, there were 6,631 people, 2,560 households, and 1,753 families in the county. The population density was 3.63/sqmi (1.40/km2). There were 3,438 housing units at an average density of 1.88/sqmi (0.73/km2). The racial makeup of the county was 65.99% White, 0.09% Black or African American, 29.98% Native American, 0.21% Asian, 0.05% Pacific Islander, 0.26% from other races, and 3.42% from two or more races. 1.31% of the population were Hispanic or Latino of any race. 37.1% were of Norwegian and 15.4% German ancestry.

There were 2,560 households, out of which 31.80% had children under the age of 18 living with them, 51.80% were married couples living together, 11.80% had a female householder with no husband present, and 31.50% were non-families. 28.50% of all households were made up of individuals, and 14.60% had someone living alone who was 65 years of age or older. The average household size was 2.53 and the average family size was 3.09.

The county population contained 28.10% under the age of 18, 6.80% from 18 to 24, 23.20% from 25 to 44, 24.20% from 45 to 64, and 17.70% who were 65 years of age or older. The median age was 40 years. For every 100 females there were 96.80 males. For every 100 females age 18 and over, there were 95.10 males.

The median income for a household in the county was $27,098, and the median income for a family was $31,864. Males had a median income of $24,750 versus $20,844 for females. The per capita income for the county was $13,422. About 14.00% of families and 19.30% of the population were below the poverty line, including 23.40% of those under age 18 and 18.30% of those age 65 or over.

Communities

Cities

 New Town
 Palermo
 Parshall
 Plaza
 Ross
 Stanley (county seat)
 White Earth

Unincorporated communities

 Belden
 Blaisdell
 Coulee
 Lostwood
 Lunds Valley
 Prairie Junction
 Sanish
 Tagus
 Van Hook
 Wabek Wabek Consolidated School

Townships

 Alger
 Austin
 Banner
 Bicker
 Big Bend
 Brookbank
 Burke
 Clearwater
 Cottonwood
 Crane Creek
 Crowfoot
 Debing
 Egan
 Fertile
 Howie
 Idaho
 James Hill
 Kickapoo
 Knife River
 Liberty
 Lostwood
 Lowland
 Manitou
 McAlmond
 McGahan
 Model
 Mountrail
 Myrtle
 Oakland
 Osborn
 Osloe
 Palermo
 Parshall
 Plaza
 Powers
 Powers Lake
 Purcell
 Rat Lake
 Redmond
 Ross
 Shell
 Sidonia
 Sikes
 Sorkness
 Spring Coulee
 Stave
 Van Hook
 Wayzetta
 White Earth

Politics
Mountrail County was historically a swing county, but now leans strongly Republican. Bill Clinton won both of his terms, and Barack Obama carried this county in the 2008 election. However, he wasn't able to carry this county in 2012, falling to Republican Mitt Romney by over 16%. Hillary Clinton received the smallest vote by a Democratic candidate (29.7%) since Progressive Party candidate Robert La Follette received an overwhelming vote in 1924.

See also
 National Register of Historic Places listings in Mountrail County, North Dakota

References

External links
 Mountrail County maps, Sheet 1 (northern) and Sheet 2 (southern), North Dakota DOT

 
North Dakota counties on the Missouri River
1909 establishments in North Dakota
Populated places established in 1909